is a group of Japanese highway bus lines managed by Keio Bus. It connects Tokyo with the areas along the Chūō Expressway, especially Yamanashi Prefecture and Nagano Prefecture.

Lines

Fuji-Goko Line
Shinjuku - Uenohara - Tsuru - Fuji-Q Highaland - Kawaguchiko Sta. - Fujisan Sta. - Oshino - Yamanakako
Shinjuku - Uenohara - Tsuru - Fuji-Q Highaland- Fujisan Sta. - Kawaguchiko Sta.  - Motosuko
 Companies：:Keio Bus, Fujikyu
 Shinjuku Kosoku Bus Terminal
 Chuo Exp. Mitaka
 Chuo Exp. Jindaiji
 Chuo Exp. Fuchu
 Chuo Exp. Hino
 Chuo Exp. Hachioji
 Chuo Exp. Sagamiko
 ||
 Chuo Exp. Uenohara
 ||
Chuo Exp. Notajiri
Chuo Exp. Saruhashi
Chuo Exp. Ogatayama
Chuo Exp. Tsuru
Chuo Exp. Shimoyoshida
Fuji-Q Highland
Kawaguchiko Station
Fujisan Station
Oshino Iriguchi
Hotel Mt. Fuji Iriguchi
Yamanaka-Kyoku Iriguchi
Yamanakako Village Office
Yamanakako Asahigaoka
Bugakusou
Yamanakako Hirano

Tama - Kawaguchiko Line 
 Minami-Osawa Sta.
 Tama-Center Sta.
 Seiseki-Sakuragaoka Sta.
 ||
 Chuo Exp. Uenohara
Chuo Exp. Notajiri
Chuo Exp. Saruhashi
Chuo Exp. Ogatayama
Chuo Exp. Tsuru
Chuo Exp. Shimoyoshida
Fuji-Q Highland
Fujisan Station
Kawaguchiko Station

The 5th uphill of Mt. Fuji Line
 Shinjuku Kosoku Bus Terminal
 Chuo Exp. Mitaka
 Chuo Exp. Jindaiji
 Chuo Exp. Fuchu
 Chuo Exp. Hino
 Chuo Exp. Hachioji
 Chuo Exp. Sagamiko
 Chuo Exp. Uenohara
 ||
 Mt. Fuji 3rd
 Mt. Fuji 5th

Kofu Line

Shinjuku Highway Bus Terminal (新宿) - Chuo Exp. Uenohara (上野原) - Kōfu Station (甲府), Yumura-Onsen (湯村温泉)
 Companies：:Keio Bus, Fujikyu, Yamanashi Kotsu

Via Isawa
Shinjuku Kosoku Bus Terminal
Chuo Exp. Mitaka
Chuo Exp. Jindaiji
Chuo Exp. Fuchu
Chuo Exp. Hino
Chuo Exp. Hachioji
Chuo Exp. Sagamiko
||
Chuo Exp. Uenohara
||
Chuo Exp. Notajiri
Chuo Exp. Saruhashi
Chuo Exp. Magi
Chuo Exp. Sasago
Chuo Exp. Kai-Yamato
Katsunuma
Ichinomiya
Isawa
Yamanashi Gakuin Univ.
Zenkoji
Chuo 3-chome
Kofu Station

Via Kofu-minami
Shinjuku Kosoku Bus Terminal
Chuo Exp. Mitaka
Chuo Exp. Jindaiji
Chuo Exp. Fuchu
Chuo Exp. Hino
Chuo Exp. Hachioji
Chuo Exp. Sagamiko
||
Chuo Exp. Uenohara
||
Chuo Exp. Nodajiri
Chuo Exp. Saruhashi
Chuo Exp. Magi
Chuo Exp. Sasago
Chuo Exp. Kai-Yamato
Chuo Exp. Shakado
Chuo Exp. Kai-Ichinomiya
Chuo Exp. Misaka
Chuo Exp. Yatsushiro
Chuo Exp. Sakaigawa
Chuo Exp. Kofu-Minami (Down only)
Nakamichi
Minami-Kofu Police Office
Ise 1-chome
Kofu Station

Koshu-Enzan Line (Koshu-Wine Liner) 
 Shinjuku Highway Bus Terminal
 ||
 Budou Bridge
 Katsunuma Town Office
 Budou no Oka
 Koshu Citty Office
 Erin-ji
 Chidoriko
 Yamanashi Cith Office
 Kofu Kamiahara

Minami-ALPS City / Minobu Line
 Shinjuku Kosoku Bus Terminal
 Chuo Exp. Mitaka
 Chuo Exp. Jindaiji
 Chuo Exp. Fuchu
 Chuo Exp. Hino
 Chuo Exp. Hachioji
 ||
 Nishi-Yahatata
 Kami-Imasuwa
 Shirane IC West
 Momozono
 Minami-Alps City Office
 Furuichiba
 Aoyagi
 Kajikazawa-Honcho
 Nishijima
 Kiriishi
 Iitomi
 Umedaira
 Minobusan
 Minobu

Chuo City / Minami-Alps City Line　(Minami-Alps Eco Park Liner) 
 Shinjuku Kosoku Bus Terminal
 Chuo Exp. Mitaka
 Chuo Exp. Jindaiji
 Chuo Exp. Fuchu
 Chuo Exp. Hino
 Chuo Exp. Hachioji
 ||
 Otsu Machi
 Yamanashi Univ. Hospital Iriguchi
 Tatomi
 Minami-Alps I.C. Iriguchi
 Minami-Alps Firehouse
 Iino-Kamishuku
 Mujina
 Hatta

Suwa / Okaya Line

Via Suwa IC
Shinjuku Kosoku Bus Terminal
Chuo Exp. Mitaka
Chuo Exp. Jindaiji
Chuo Exp. Fuchu
Chuo Exp. Hino
Chuo Exp. Hachioji
||
Chuo Exp. Showa
Chuo Exp. Futaba-Higashi
Chuo Exp. Nirasaki
Chuo Exp. Akeno
Chuo Exp. Sutama
Chuo Exp. Nagasaka-Takane
Chuo Exp. Yatsugatake
Chuo Exp. Kobuchizawa
Chuo Exp. Fujimi
Chuo Exp. Hara
Chuo Exp. Chino
Suwa IC Mae
Kami-Suwa Station
Shimosuwa
Osachi
Okaya City Office
Okaya Station

Via Okaya IC
Shinjuku Kosoku Bus Terminal
Chuo Exp. Mitaka
Chuo Exp. Jindaiji
Chuo Exp. Fuchu
Chuo Exp. Hino
Chuo Exp. Hachioji
||
Chuo Exp. Showa
Chuo Exp. Futaba-Higashi
Chuo Exp. Nirasaki
Chuo Exp. Akeno
Chuo Exp. Sutama
Chuo Exp. Nagasaka-Takane
Chuo Exp. Yatsugatake
Chuo Exp. Kobuchizawa
Chuo Exp. Fujimi
Chuo Exp. Hara
Chuo Exp. Chino
Chuo Exp. Aruga
Imai
Okaya City Office
Okaya Station
Osachi
Shimosuwa
Kami-Suwa Station

Ina Line
 Shinjuku Highway Bus Terminal
 Chuo Exp. Mitaka
 Chuo Exp. Jindaiji
 Chuo Exp. Fuchu
 Chuo Exp. Hino
 Chuo Exp. Hachioji
 ||
 Chuo Exp. Kawagishi
 Chuo Exp. Tatsuno
 Chuo Exp. Minowa
 Ina I.C. Mae
 Inashi
 Sawando
 Miyada
 Komagane-Shi
 Ina-Bus Komagane Garrage

Iida Line
 Shinjuku Highway Bus Terminal
 Chuo Exp. Mitaka
 Chuo Exp. Jindaiji
 Chuo Exp. Fuchu
 Chuo Exp. Hino
 Chuo Exp. Hachioji
 ||
 Chuo Exp. Kawagishi
 Chuo Exp. Tatsuno
 Chuo Exp. Minowa
 Chuo Exp. Ina I.C.
 Chuo Exp. Nishi-Haruchika
 Chuo Exp. Miyada
 Chuo Exp. Komagane I.C.
 Iijima
 Matsukawa
 Takamori
 Kami-Iida
 Igara
 Iida Sta.
 Iida Chamber of Commerce and Industry

Tachikawa - Iida Line 
 Haijima Sta
 Akishima Sta.
 Tachikawa Sta.
 ||
 Chuo Exp. Tatsuno
 Chuo Exp. Minowa
 Chuo Exp. Ina I.C.
 Chuo Exp. Nishi-Haruchika
 Chuo Exp. Miyada
 Chuo Exp. Komagane I.C.
 Iijima
 Matsukawa
 Takamori
 Kami-Iida
 Igara
 Iida Sta.

Kiso-Fukushima Line
 Shinjuku Highway Bus Terminal
 Chuo Exp. Mitaka
 Chuo Exp. Jindaiji
 Chuo Exp. Fuchu
 Chuo Exp. Hino
 Chuo Exp. Hachioji
 ||
 Shiojiri Sta.
 Motoyama-juku
 Urushi no Sato Hirasawa
 Narai-juku
 Yabuhara
 Hiyoshi Kisokoma Heights
 Fukushima  Inspection
 Kiso-Fukushima Sta.

Matsumoto Line
Shinjuku Kosoku Bus Terminal
Chuo Exp. Hino
||
Nagano Exp. Midoriko
Nagano Exp. Hirookanomura
Nagano Exp. Kambayashi
Matsumoto IC-mae
Matsumoto Bus Terminal
Companies:Keio Bus / Matsumoto Electric Railway
It takes a rest in Futaba SA.

Hakuba Line
Shinjuku Kosoku Bus Terminal
Chuo Exp. Mitaka
Chuo Exp. Jindaiji
Chuo Exp. Fuchu
Chuo Exp. Hino
Chuo Exp. Hachioji
||
Azumino Swiss Mura
Azumino Hotaka
Azumino Matsukawa
Shinano-Omachi Station
Hakuba-Goryu
Hakuba-Cho
Hakuba-Happo
Companies:Keio Bus / Matsumoto Electric Railway
It takes a rest in Futaba SA and Azusagawa SA.

HidaTakayama Line
 Shinjuku Highway Bus Terminal
 Chuo Exp. Mitaka
 Chuo Exp. Jindaiji
 Chuo Exp. Fuchu
 Chuo Exp. Hino
 Chuo Exp. Hachioji
 ||
 Hirayu Onsen
 Nyukawa
 Takayama Nouhi Bus Center

Nagoya Line
 Shinjuku Highway Bus Terminal
 Chuo Exp. Mitaka
 Chuo Exp. Jindaiji
 Chuo Exp. Fuchu
 Fuchu Sta.
 Seiseki-Sakuragaoka Sta
 Chuo Exp. Hino
 Chuo Exp. Hachioji
 ||
 Magome
 Nakatsugawa
 Ena
 Mizunami-Tentoku
 Tajimi
 Toukadai
 Kachigawa Sta.
 Sakae
 Nagoya (Meitetsu Bus Center)

History

Cars

See also
Tokyo - Nagano Line, It used to be running via Chuo Expressway.

Highway bus routes in Japan